Francisco António Lucas Vital (born 27 June 1954) is a Portuguese former football forward and manager.

Playing career
Born in Braga, Vital spent all of his early career in the second division, mainly with G.D. Riopele. In 1977 he signed with FC Porto, going on to be irregularly played by the Primeira Liga club during his two-and-a-half-season spell and winning two national championships, contributing with a career-best 21 games and five goals in the 1978–79 edition.

In January 1980, Vital moved to La Liga with Real Betis – his only abroad experience – returning to his country in the summer to join S.L. Benfica, with whom he won another league as well as one Portuguese Cup and one domestic Supercup. After spending the 1981–82 campaign with Boavista F.C. he returned to the second level, where he remained until his retirement at the age of 33, mostly with F.C. Vizela.

As a Porto player, Vital appeared once for Portugal, featuring 45 minutes in a 4–0 home win against Cyprus for the 1978 FIFA World Cup qualifiers and scoring the third.

|}

Coaching career
Vital worked almost exclusively in the Portuguese lower leagues, his first stint being precisely with his last club Vizela. In 1997–98, his only season in the top tier, he was one of four managers for Sporting CP – having started as an assistant with the team – winning one match, drawing two and losing one as the Lions went on to finish in fourth position.

In the second part of the 2000s, Vital coached mainly in Vietnam, helping Đồng Tâm Long An F.C. return to the V-League in 2012.

References

External links

1954 births
Living people
Sportspeople from Braga
Portuguese footballers
Association football forwards
Primeira Liga players
Liga Portugal 2 players
F.C. Famalicão players
G.D. Riopele players
FC Porto players
S.L. Benfica footballers
Boavista F.C. players
S.C. Farense players
C.F. Os Belenenses players
F.C. Tirsense players
F.C. Vizela players
La Liga players
Real Betis players
Portugal youth international footballers
Portugal under-21 international footballers
Portugal international footballers
Portuguese expatriate footballers
Expatriate footballers in Spain
Portuguese expatriate sportspeople in Spain
Portuguese football managers
Primeira Liga managers
Liga Portugal 2 managers
F.C. Famalicão managers
Sporting CP managers
F.C. Penafiel managers
Associação Naval 1º de Maio managers
G.D. Chaves managers
Portuguese expatriate football managers
Expatriate football managers in Vietnam
Portuguese expatriate sportspeople in Vietnam